The XIII Bomber Command  was an inactive United States Army Air Forces formation. It was last assigned to Thirteenth Air Force, based at Clark Field, Luzon, Philippines. It was inactivated on 15 March 1946.

History
XIII Bomber Command was a World War II command and control organization for Thirteenth Air Force. Its mission was to provide command and control authority of Army Air Force bombardment organizations within the Thirteenth Air Force Area of Responsibility.

Participated in the following campaigns: Central Pacific; China Defensive; Guadalcanal; New Guinea; Northern Solomons; Eastern Mandates; Bismarck Archipelago; Western Pacific; Leyte; Luzon; Southern Philippines; China Offensive.

Lineage
 Constituted as the XIII Bomber Command on 14 December 1942
 Activated on 13 January 1943
 Inactivated on 15 March 1946
 Disbanded on 8 October 1948

Assignments
 Thirteenth Air Force, 13 January 1943 – 15 March 1946

Stations
 Pekoa Airfield, Espiritu Santo, New Hebrides, 13 January 1943
 Carney Airfield, Guadalcanal, Solomon Islands, 20 August 1943
 Momote Airfield, Los Negros Island, Admiralty Islands, June 1944
 Wakde Airfield, Wakde, Netherlands East Indies. 3 September 1944
 Wama Airfield, Morotai, Netherlands East Indies. 17 October 1944
 Clark Field, Luzon, Philippines, 27 August 1945 – 15 March 1946

Components
 Groups
 5th Bombardment Group, 13 January 1943 – 15 December 1945
 11th Bombardment Group, 9 November 1943 – 15 March 1946
 42d Bombardment Group, 22 April 1943 – 25 December 1945 (attached to 308th Bombardment Wing, c. 24 August 1944; 310th Bombardment Wing, 3 September 1944; Thirteenth Air Task Force, c. 15 September 1944; XIII Fighter Command, 1 October 1944; XIII Bomber Command Rear Echelon, 9 January – 24 February 1945; XIII Fighter Command, c. 22 March – c. September 1945)
 307th Bombardment Group, February 1943 – December 1945
 494th Bombardment Group: under operational control 20–27 March 1945)

 Squadrons
 5th Tactical Air Communications Squadron: 20 October – 28 November 1945
 9th Tactical Air Communications Squadron: 20 October – 28 November 1945
 14th Tow Target Squadron: c. November – 27 December 1945
 342d Fighter Squadron: attached c. 25 August – 22 September 1944
 550th Night Fighter Squadron: attached 14 February – 7 April 1945

See also
 United States Army Air Forces in the South Pacific Area

References

Notes
 Explanatory notes

 Citations

Bibliography

 
 

13 Command Bomb
Military units and formations established in 1943
Military units and formations disestablished in 1946